Vow of Chastity (Italian: Voto di castità) is a 1976 Italian erotic comedy. It was directed by Joe D'Amato, who also acted as cinematographer. The story and screenplay were by George Eastman.

The film's tonal switches between light comedy and eroticism, along with serious themes such as the protagonist's Oedipus complex and a horrific dream-sequence with a splatter element, were both criticised and praised.

Voto di castità is considered noteworthy for bringing Joe D'Amato and Laura Gemser together for the first time. They soon developed a friendship and professional partnership. Gemser starred in many D'Amato films and worked for his productions as costume designer.

Cast
Jacques Dufilho ... Annibale
Gillian Bray ... Lisa
Enzo Colajacono ... Andrea
Laura Gemser ... Iliana
Francesco Mulè ... Teodoro
Flavia Sabiana (Sofia Dionisio)
Gastone Pesucci
Maria Tedeschi
Piero Santipulci
Antonio D'Auria
Maria Carisi
Giovanna Chemeri
Rosa Coppolino

Production
In an interview with the Italian film magazine Nocturno, Gemser stated that although this was a comedy, her role was more erotic than funny since she was nude most of the time, even though the situations were comedic - or at least were supposed to be.

Release
The film was theatrically released in Italy. The French title was Voeu de chasteté, and according to Marco Giusti, the international title was Girl in a Seminary.

Voto di castità was also released on DVD in Italy by CG Entertainment in their "Cinekult" series, featuring the film in its Italian language version as an anamorphic widescreen transfer, with Italian subtitles. The DVD also included an interview with Eastman and the film in its super 8 version.

The film had previously been released on VHS by Universal-Video, Magnum 3B, and Shendene (in its series "I maestri dell'erotismo - Il cinema di Joe D'Amato").

The film is now distributed worldwide by Variety Distribution.

Reception
Marco Giusti calls the film  and sees its major value in the fact that it brought together D'Amato and Gemser.

Gordiano Lupi concurred with that judgement. He observed that the film contaminates comedy with erotic film proper, pointing out the length of Gemser's nude ballet-like dance in her bedroom in front of the boy. Lupi also noted the splatter-horror influence in the dreamlike sequence. However, he concluded that it is not a great film precisely because of its indecision between its comic and serious aspects, such as the main character's oedipodal problem. Good actors were misused, and some scenes seem to have been inserted to draw out the runtime.

Sébastien Gayraud, in contrast, applauded the film as one that is more than a mere sidenote in D'Amato's filmography and deserves to be rediscovered. He observed parallels between the morbid dream-sequences of Voto di castità and D'Amato's previous film Emanuelle's Revenge (1975), and viewed the boy Andrea as the first of D'Amato's impotent and frustrated male anti-heroes - a type that would return in Beyond the Darkness (1979) and A Lustful Mind (1986).

Bibliography

References

Films directed by Joe D'Amato
Italian sex comedy films
1970s sex comedy films
1970s Italian-language films
Commedia sexy all'italiana
1976 comedy films
1976 films
1970s Italian films